Hallingdal District Court is a district court located in Nesbyen, Norway.  It covers the municipalities of Flå, Nes, Gol, Hemsedal, Ål and Hol  and is subordinate Borgarting Court of Appeal.

References

External links 
Official site 

Defunct district courts of Norway
Organisations based in Nesbyen